Lamazère is a commune in the Gers department in southwestern France.

Geography
The Petite Baïse forms part of the commune's southern border, flows northwest through the middle of the commune, then forms part of its northwestern border.

Population

See also
 Communes of the Gers department

References

Communes of Gers